The men's sprint competition at the 2006 Asian Games was held from 11 to 13 December at the Aspire Hall 1.

Schedule
All times are Arabia Standard Time (UTC+03:00)

Records

Results
Legend
DNF — Did not finish
DNS — Did not start
REL — Relegated

Qualifying

1/8 finals

Heat 1

Heat 2

Heat 3

Heat 4

Heat 5

Heat 6

Heat 7

Heat 8

Quarterfinals B

Heat 1

Heat 2

Heat 3

Heat 4

Quarterfinals

Heat 1

Heat 2

Heat 3

Heat 4

Race for 5th–8th places

Semifinals B

Heat 1

Heat 2

Semifinals

Heat 1

Heat 2

Finals B

Race for 11th–12th places

Race for 9th–10th places

Finals

Bronze

Gold

Final standing

References

External links 
Results

Track Men sprint